A leadership election was held by the United Malays National Organisation (UMNO) party in 28 June 1981. It was won by then Deputy Prime Minister and then Deputy President of UMNO, Mahathir Mohamad.

Supreme Council election results
[ Source]

Permanent Chairman

Deputy Permanent Chairman

President

Deputy President

Vice Presidents

Supreme Council Members

See also
1982 Malaysian general election
First Mahathir cabinet

References

1981 elections in Malaysia
United Malays National Organisation leadership election
United Malays National Organisation leadership elections